Zheng Yuansen (born in Guangzhou on 17 July 1989) is a Chinese boccia player who began playing the sport in 2008. 

He won a gold medal in Boccia at the 2010 Asian Para Games. He is assured a medal at the 2012 Summer Paralympics after defeating Stephen McGuire 12–0. McGuire complimented his playing, saying of Zheng "He has got so much power, he played really great. In the end I couldn't compete with his power and this was my toughest match of the competition."

References 

Boccia players at the 2012 Summer Paralympics
Sportspeople from Guangzhou
1989 births
Living people
Medalists at the 2012 Summer Paralympics
Paralympic gold medalists for China
Boccia players at the 2016 Summer Paralympics
Paralympic boccia players of China
Paralympic medalists in boccia
Boccia players at the 2020 Summer Paralympics